Metro Pictures was a New York City art gallery founded in 1980 by Janelle Reiring (previously of Leo Castelli Gallery), and Helene Winer (previously of Artists Space). It was located in SoHo until 1995 when it moved to Chelsea. The gallery closed in December of 2021.

Artists
Metro's opening group exhibition in 1980 included Cindy Sherman, Robert Longo, Troy Brauntuch, Jack Goldstein, Sherrie Levine, James Welling, and Richard Prince.

During the early and mid-1980s, Mike Kelley, Louise Lawler, Martin Kippenberger, John Miller, Tony Oursler, Walter Robinson, and Jim Shaw joined the gallery. Newer generations of artists have continued to expand the gallery's offerings. These artists include Gary Simmons, Olaf Breuning, Andy Hope 1930, Andre Butzer, Sara VanDerBeek, Tris Vonna-Michell, Trevor Paglen, Camille Henrot, Sam Falls (since 2013), Judith Hopf (since 2017), and Gretchen Bender (since 2020).

History
In 1996, Metro Pictures teamed up with two other galleries – Gladstone Gallery and Matthew Marks Gallery – to acquire and divide up a  warehouse at 515 West 24th Street. The space was renovated by 1100 Architect in 2016. It closed in December 2021.

References

External links
 Metro Pictures Gallery

Art museums and galleries in Manhattan
Art galleries established in 1980
1980 establishments in New York City
Chelsea, Manhattan